Paul McLean (born 2 February 1990) is a Scottish professional footballer who plays as a defender for Stirling Albion. McLean previously played with Brechin City, where he spent 10 years and also captained the side.

Career
McLean started his career as a youth player with Norwich City F.C. Under-23s and Academy, after a successful trial in 2005 saw him being offered a contract for the 2006–07 season. He spent two years in England, before subsequently moving back to Scotland with Falkirk in 2007. His first contract as a senior footballer came when, at the age of 19, he was signed by Jim Duffy for Brechin City on a two-year deal.

After 10 years at Brechin, McLean left the club in May 2019 and signed for Stirling Albion.

Career statistics

Personal life
Outside of football, McLean works in medical research at Edinburgh Royal Infirmary.

References

External links

1990 births
Living people
Scottish footballers
Association football defenders
Brechin City F.C. players
Stirling Albion F.C. players
Scottish Professional Football League players